The Mumbai Marathon (known as the Tata Mumbai Marathon for sponsorship reasons by Tata Group), is an annual international marathon held in Mumbai, India, on the third Sunday of January every year. It is the largest marathon in Asia as well as the largest mass participation sporting event on the continent. It is the richest race in India with a prize pool of US$405000.

The Mumbai Marathon has six different race categories: Marathon (42.195 km), Half Marathon (21.097 km), Dream Run (6 km), Senior Citizens' Run (4.3 km), Champions with Disability (2.4 km), and a Timed 10K.

The course records set in 2013 were the fastest times ever run for a marathon in India in the women's marathon category – 2:24:33 by the women's winner Valentine Kipketer, Kenya. In 2020, Derara Hurisa broke the men's marathon record, completing the race in 2:08:15. In 2023, 2 new course records were set. For the men's, Hayle Lemi set a new record of 2:07:32 as the marathon's winner. For the women's, Anchialem Haymanot set a new record of 2:24:15 as the marathon's winner. 

The event helped bridge the gap between Indian elite athletes and the international elite. Indian runner Ram Singh Yadav qualified for the  2012 Summer Olympics with his best marathon time of 2:16:59 at the 2012 edition.

It was not held for two years in 2021 and 2022 during the COVID-19 pandemic. The following edition was held on 15 January 2023.

History 
Inspired by the London Marathon, Procam International believed that Mumbai would support such a road race. The first event was held in 2004, titled as the Standard Chartered Mumbai International Marathon. Standard Chartered Bank continued as the event's title sponsor for 14 years up until 2017. In 2018, the Tata Group and Tata Consultancy Services replaced Standard Chartered as the Marathon sponsor for a period of 10 years.

In 2005, Mumbai Marathon was included as one of the legs of "The Greatest Race on Earth", sponsored by Standard Chartered. The other three legs of this four-marathon race were the Singapore Marathon, the Nairobi Marathon and the Hong Kong Marathon, which were all sponsored by the Bank as well.

The race became an IAAF Silver Label Road Race in 2009. The IAAF elevated the race to an IAAF Gold Label Road Race in 2010, which was taken away in 2013 remaining unlabelled until 2018 when the Silver Label was awarded. The 2019 edition was classified as a Gold Label again.

Inspiration Medal 
The inspiration medal is an award that started in 2018, when Tata Group took control of the event. The initiative was to increase participation and encourage marathoners to complete the marathon run (42 K.m.).The medal has two sides, and it reads the finisher on one side and the inspiration on the other. Hence, it helps to share the joy of winning with their inspiration.

Organization 
Mumbai Marathon is the property of Procam International Pvt. Ltd., a Mumbai-based sports management company. Procam International also owns other road races in India such as the Airtel Delhi Half Marathon, Tata Consultancy Services World 10K Bangalore, and Tata Steel Kolkata 25K.

The Race 

The six categories cater to different participants. They are the Marathon (42.195 km), Half Marathon (21.097 km), Dream Run (6 km), Senior Citizens Event (4.3 km), and Champions with Disability Event (2.4 km). The Timed 10K has been introduced from the 2018 edition of the Mumbai Marathon.

The marathon starts opposite Chhatrapati Shivaji Terminus Mumbai. It passes many of the city's iconic locations such as Flora Fountain, Marine Drive, Chowpatty, Haji Ali, Mahim Church, and the Bandra–Worli Sea Link. The London marathon winner and the secretary of the Association of International Marathons and Distance Races, Hugh Jones, is the race director.

Winners 
Key:

Multiple wins

By country

Charity 
The Mumbai Marathon is India's largest charity platform for non-profit organisations to raise funds. NGOs represent causes such as arts, culture and sports, civic and community development, disability, education, environment and wildlife, health, human rights, social services, vocational training, and women, children and the aged. Organizations register with the Event's official Philanthropy Partner, United Way Mumbai. Some NGOs used this event as a platform to raise awareness for their work, and some to directly raise funds. Fundraising is facilitated by an easy-to-use model designed for all groups to raise funds.

Over ₹1.9 billion (US$29 million) has been raised from year 2004 to year 2017.

The first race in 2004 had 22,000 participants and raised ₹14.4 million (US$269,000). Both the number of participants and amount of money raised rose drastically over the years with 30,000 people running in 2007 (₹79.4 million, US$1,490,000). The 2017 edition hosted 42,000 runners (₹329 million, US$ 5,087,761).

Dream Team 
This special category is meant for highly motivated individuals who feel passionately about a cause and commit to raise a substantial sum of funds. Over the years, the Dream Team has seen a mix of business magnates, celebrities, socialites, NGO trustees and students. Levels include:
 Dream Champion – minimum pledge of INR 1 million.
 Dream Wizard – minimum pledge of INR 500,000
 Dream Maker – minimum pledge of INR 100,000

Corporate Challenge 
The Corporate Challenge is a category for companies who wish to sponsor employee teams to participate in event and raise funds. 166 companies fielded 257 Corporate Challenge teams at Mumbai Marathon 2013.

Philanthropy Partner 
United Way Mumbai is Mumbai Marathon's Philanthropy Partner. UWM assumes the role of a "Philanthropy Exchange" for charities and non-profit organizations that register with the Event. The Philanthropy Partner's roles are to:

 Facilitate & supplement pledge raising efforts of individuals, companies and NGOs.
 Create, build and communicate the Charity Structure.
 Work on all aspects of Charity like registrations, race day logistics, communications and receiving donations.
 Accounting & reconciling of Pledges.
 Disbursement of funds to beneficiary NGOs.
 80G receipts to all donors.

UWM maintains neutrality and ensures a level playing field among all participating NGOs. UWM also serves as an assurance to the donor that the NGO and the cause for which money is being donated are credible.

Flame of Marathon 
Mumbai Marathon was the youngest marathon to be awarded the "Flame of the Marathon". It was flown in from Greece by Maria Polyzou, Greek Marathon Champion and Director of the Museum of Marathon Runs. They were received by then Mayor of Mumbai Smt. Shraddha Jadhav at Chhatrapati Shivaji International Airport. The flame was carried by sports luminaries, celebrities, sponsors/partners and dignitaries from the government in a flame relay to the Hutatma Chowk in Fountain, Mumbai. The participants of the torch relay were celebrities including Priya Dutt, Jaspal Bindra, Rahul Bose, John Abraham, Shobha De, Milind Soman, Dhanraj Pillay and Kiran More.

Trophy 
To commemorate Mumbai Marathon's 10th edition, a rolling trophy was instituted, to be handed over to the men's and women's marathon champions.

The trophy was unveiled by Shri K. Sankaranarayanan, (then) Governor of Maharashtra.

The trophy was designed by artist and sculptor Shri Paresh Maity.

Event Ambassadors 
The international ambassadors for the Mumbai Marathon have been:

 2004—Michael Duane Johnson
 2005—Paul Tergat, Steve Ovett
 2006—Anju Bobby George, Linford Christie
 2007—Dame Kelly Holmes, Aravinda De Silva
 2008—Gabriela Szabo
 2009—Gail Devers
 2010—Daniel O'Brien
 2011—Catherine Freeman
 2012—Vijay Amritraj
 2013—Haile Gebrselassie
 2014—Damon Hill
 2015—Marion Bartoli
 2016—Edwin Moses
 2017—David Rudisha
 2018—Sergey Bubka
 2019—Mary Kom
 2020—Shannon Miller
 2023—Tiger Shroff

Sponsors/partners 
 Title sponsor: Tata
 Channel partner: Star Sports
 Sports Goods partner: Asics
 Driven by: Altroz
 Timing partner: Seiko
 Recovery partner: Volini
 Hydration partner: Bisleri
 Hospitality partner: Trident
 Print partner: The Times of India
 Radio partner: Radio Mirchi
 Medical Partner: Asian Heart Institute
 Philanthropy partner: United Way Mumbai
 Institution partner: HelpAge India
 Supported by: Government of Maharashtra, M.C.G.M, Indian Navy
 Under the aegis of: Athletics Federation of India
 Certified by: AIMS

References

External links 

 Running Races in India
 2009 Mumbai Marathon in Photos
 Mumbai Marathon Anthem Release

Marathons in India
Recurring sporting events established in 2004
Sports competitions in Mumbai
Standard Chartered
Annual sporting events in India
2004 establishments in Maharashtra